Cereus ( "serious") is a genus of cacti (family Cactaceae) including around 33 species of large columnar cacti from South America. The name is derived from Greek (κηρός) and Latin words meaning "wax", "torch" or "candle". Cereus was one of the first cactus genera to be described; the circumscription varies depending on the authority. The term "cereus" is also sometimes used for a ceroid cactus, any cactus with a very elongated body, including columnar growth cacti and epiphytic cacti.

Description
Cereus are shrubby or treelike, often attaining great heights (C. hexagonus, C. lamprospermus, C. trigonodendron up to ). Cephalium is not present; C. mortensenii develops pseudocephalium. The seeds are large, curved ovoid, glossy black.

Taxonomy
The name Cereus originates in a book by Tabernaemontanus published in 1625 and refers to the candle-like form of species C. hexagonus. It was described by Philip Miller in 1754, and included all known cacti with very elongated bodies.

Ludwig Pfeiffer in 1838 distinguished Cephalocereus (type Cephalocereus senilis); the name is derived from the Greek κεφᾶλή (cephalē; 'head') thus headed cereus, referring to the hairy pseudocephalium. Charles Lemaire described Pilocereus in 1839, now renamed as Pilosocereus. The name Pilocereus is derived from the Greek πῖλος (pilos), felted, hairy, thus hairy cereus, similar to the Latin pilosus, from which the name Pilosocereus was derived. Echinocereus (type Echinocereus viridiflorus) was described in 1848 by George Engelmann; the name is derived from the Greek ἐχῖνος (echinos; 'hedgehog' or 'sea urchin').

Nathaniel Lord Britton and Joseph Nelson Rose (1919–1923) as well as Alwin Berger (1929) continued to divide Cereus into many genera. The 33 or so species that remain in the Cereus group are largely plants that have not been moved out of the genus rather than plants that have been included because they fit the description of Cereus. This inclusion-by-lack-of-exclusion makes for a very messy and unsatisfactory grouping.

The genus Mirabella has been included within Cereus as a subgenus, C. subg. Mirabella.

Species

, Plants of the World Online accepts the following species (with the exception of C. ayisyen):

Synonyms
Species that have formerly been accepted include:
 Cereus adelmarii, syn. of Cereus phatnospermus
 Cereus albicaulis, syn. of Mirabella albicaulis
 Cereus argentinensis, syn. of Cereus stenogonus
 Cereus braunii, syn. of Cereus trigonodendron
 Cereus cochabambensis, syn. of Cereus forbesii
 Cereus comarapanus, syn. of Cereus forbesii
 Cereus estevesii, syn. of Mirabella estevesii
 Cereus hankeanus, syn. of Cereus forbesii
 Cereus huilunchu, syn. of Cereus forbesii
 Cereus kroenleinii, syn. of Cereus phatnospermus
 Cereus mirabella, syn. of Mirabella minensis
 Cereus roseiflorus, syn. of Cereus stenogonus
 Cereus tacuaralensis, syn. of Cereus stenogonus

Distribution
The range includes Brazil, northern Argentina, Paraguay, Uruguay, and Bolivia; more rarely it can be found in Peru, Colombia, Guyana, Suriname, and Venezuela.

Uses
The fruits and stems of C. repandus are edible, as is the fruit of many species in the genus; some perhaps have a laxative effect. The wood has been used in making furniture and for firewood, and sliced stems have been used as a soap substitute. The stems can be broken open for its pulp, a source of water. The plant is also cultivated as a living fence.

Gallery

References

Sources

External links
 
 
 Columnar cacti – Cereus
 Cactiguide Cereus

 
Cacti of South America
Cactoideae genera
Taxa named by Philip Miller